Folayemi "Fo" Debra Wilson is an American interdisciplinary artist, designer, and academic administrator. Her practice includes work as a furniture designer and maker, installation artist, muralist, and graphic designer. Wilson is the first associate dean for access and equity in the Penn State College of Arts and Architecture.

Early life and education 
Wilson has an MBA degree from New York University Stern School of Business, and a MFA degree (2005) in furniture design from Rhode Island School of Design (RISD).

Design career 
In her early career she worked as a graphic designer, art director, and creative director. Wilson worked for Essence and YSB magazines. In 1984, Wilson was named the first female art director at Essence magazine. In 1991, she established Studio W., a graphic design studio, building off her professional experiences from work in the magazine industry.

In August 2016, she co-founded with Norman Teague the blkHaUS Studios, a design studio based in Chicago. Their work was social practice–focused, in order to make public spaces in Chicago more inviting. The blkHaUS Studios' Back Alley Jazz project worked to revive the jazz culture and traditions found in Chicago in the 1960s and 1970s; they brought together local musicians, architects and artists to build events and performance spaces.

Visual art career 
In 1995, Renee Cox, Fo Wilson, and Tony Cokes created the Negro Art Collective (NAC) to fight cultural misrepresentations about Black Americans.

In 2008, Wilson constructed a fictitious, 19th-century style scientific exhibition commemorating Sartje Baartman (also known as "The Hottentot Venus") during a residency at the School of Art + Design at SUNY/Purchase.

Her 2016 installation Eliza's Peculiar Cabinet of Curiosities, was a constructed, full-scale, 19th century, fictional, slave cabin with a cabinet of curiosities full of a 100 items of what an African American woman of this time period may have owned or dreamed of owning. Eliza's Peculiar Cabinet of Curiosities was an ongoing, Afrofuturist project and was used as a location for related events and performances; on display in 2016 to 2017 at the Lynden Sculpture Garden in Milwaukee, Wisconsin.

In 2019, she was commissioned to create public art for the Chicago Transit Authority (CTA) within the newly built Damen Green Line station. Her work is in the museum collection at the Cooper Hewitt, Smithsonian Design Museum. Wilson has served on the board of the American Craft Council (ACC).

Academic career 
In July 2021, Wilson was appointed as first associate dean for access and equity in the Penn State College of Arts and Architecture. She previously was the co-director of academic diversity, equity and inclusion at the Columbia College Chicago.

Publications 

 
 Wilson, Fo (2013). The Baartman Diaries (Chicago, Illinois: Studio W Editions).

See also 
 Cheryl D. Miller
 List of African-American visual artists

References 

Living people
People from Chicago
African-American designers
American furniture designers
New York University Stern School of Business alumni
Rhode Island School of Design alumni
American women installation artists
American installation artists
American women graphic designers
American art directors
21st-century American women
African-American academic administrators
Afrofuturists
African-American graphic designers
Year of birth missing (living people)
African-American women academic administrators